Solomon Mobley "Sol" Carter (December 23, 1908, Picayune, Mississippi – December 23, 2006, El Dorado, Arkansas) was a relief pitcher in Major League Baseball who played for the Philadelphia Athletics in the 1931 season. He batted and threw right-handed.

In two appearances,  Carter posted a 0–0 record with two strikeout, four walks, and a 19.29 ERA in  innings pitched.

At the time of his death on his 98th birthday, Carter was recognized as the fourth oldest living former major leaguer.

External links

Retrosheet

1908 births
2006 deaths
Philadelphia Athletics players
Major League Baseball pitchers
People from Picayune, Mississippi
Baseball players from Mississippi
Auburn Tigers baseball players
Lexington Giants (KITTY League) players